Hersman is a surname. Notable people with the surname include:

Deborah Hersman, chair of the U.S. National Transportation Safety Board
Erik Hersman, technologist, blogger and commentator
Hugh S. Hersman (1872–1954), American politician
Martin Hersman (born 1974), Dutch skater

See also 
Hersman, Illinois, unincorporated community in Brown County, Illinois, United States
31203 Hersman, main-belt asteroid